Beach woodball at the 2012 Asian Beach Games was held from 18 June to 21 June 2012 in Haiyang, China.

Medalists

Medal table

Results

Men's singles
18–21 June

 Lin Yu-hsien was awarded bronze because of no three-medal sweep per country rule.

Men's team
18–20 June

Women's singles
18–21 June

 Wu Chih-han was awarded bronze because of no three-medal sweep per country rule.

Women's team
18–20 June

References
 Official site

2012 Asian Beach Games events
2012